Jelambar Baru is an administrative village in the Grogol Petamburan district of Indonesia. It has postal code of 11460.

West Jakarta
Administrative villages in Jakarta